Paphiopedilum urbanianum is a species of plant in the family Orchidaceae. It is endemic to Mindoro in the Philippines.  Its natural habitat is subtropical or tropical moist lowland forests. It is almost extinct in the wild, partly due to habitat loss, but even more so because of unsustainable collecting for the horticultural trade.

References

urbanianum
Critically endangered plants
Endemic orchids of the Philippines
Flora of the Philippines
Taxonomy articles created by Polbot
Plants described in 1981